Qurubaan is a Maldivian television series developed for Television Maldives by Mariyam Shauqee. Written by Fathimath Nahula, the series stars Ahmed Giyas, Hawwa and Aishath Shiranee in pivotal roles.

Cast

Main
 Ahmed Giyas as Shafraz
 Hawwa as Reesha
 Aishath Shiranee as Nasha

Recurring
 Mohamed Asif as Amir
 Waleedha Waleed as Nashfa
 Aishath Hanim as Shakeela
 Ibrahim Shakir as Hameed
 Arifa Ibrahim as Khadheeja
 Suneetha Ali as Shifa

Guest
 Shahidha as Reesha
 Mariyam as Aminath
 Neena as Fathimath
 Majeed
 Zahid
 Rusdhee
 Abdulla Rasheed
 Khalid
 Amir

Episodes

Soundtrack

References

Serial drama television series
Maldivian television shows